The 2003 FIVB Girls Youth Volleyball World Championship was held in Piła/Wloclawek, Poland from 9 to 17 August 2003. 16 teams participated in the tournament.

Qualification process

 * Chinese Taipei replaced North Korea.
 ** Czech Republic replaced Germany.

Pools composition

First round

Pool A

|}

|}

Pool B

|}

|}

Pool C

|}

|}

Pool D

|}

|}

Second round

Play off – elimination group

|}

Play off – seeding group

|}

Final round

Quarterfinals

|}

5th–8th semifinals

|}

Semifinals

|}

7th place

|}

5th place

|}

3rd place

|}

Final

|}

Final standing

Individual awards

Most Valuable Player

Best Scorer

Best Spiker

Best Blocker

Best Digger

Best Setter

Best Receiver

References

World Championship
2003 in Polish sport
FIVB Volleyball Girls' U18 World Championship